Paulo Sérgio de Oliveira Lima (born 24 July 1954), better known as Paulo Sérgio, was a Brazilian footballer who played as a goalkeeper.

During his career (1972–1988) he played for Fluminense, CSA, Volta Redonda, Americano, Botafogo, Goiás, Vasco da Gama and America. For the Brazilian team he played three matches, between May 1981 and May 1982, and was in the squad for the 1982 FIFA World Cup.

References

1954 births
Living people
Footballers from Rio de Janeiro (city)
Brazilian footballers
Association football goalkeepers
Fluminense FC players
Botafogo de Futebol e Regatas players
Goiás Esporte Clube players
America Football Club (RJ) players
CR Vasco da Gama players
Volta Redonda FC players
Centro Sportivo Alagoano players
Americano Futebol Clube players
1982 FIFA World Cup players
Brazil international footballers
Brazilian beach soccer players
Beach soccer goalkeepers